The Duluth and Iron Range Railroad  was founded in 1874.

In 1884, it ran the first main line train between Two Harbors and Soudan, Minnesota, a total distance of 68 miles. In July 1938, the railway merged with the Duluth, Missabe and Northern Railway to form the Duluth, Missabe and Iron Range Railway.

References

 
Predecessors of the Duluth, Missabe and Iron Range Railway
Defunct Minnesota railroads
Former Class I railroads in the United States
Railway companies established in 1874
Railway companies disestablished in 1938
1874 establishments in Minnesota
American companies established in 1874
American companies disestablished in 1938